Graham Sandley is a male former international table tennis player from England.

Table tennis career
He represented England at two World Table Tennis Championships in the Swaythling Cup (men's team event) from 1983-1985.

He also won an English National Table Tennis Championships title.

See also
 List of England players at the World Team Table Tennis Championships

References

English male table tennis players
1963 births
Living people